Casey Gardner Jacobsen (born March 19, 1981) is an American retired professional basketball player who played four seasons in the National Basketball Association (NBA). He also had an extensive European basketball career, mostly while playing with Brose Baskets Bamberg, in Germany. With Brose, he won the Bundesliga championship in 2007 and 2010, while also receiving the German League Finals MVP award. He won Bundesliga championships in 2011, 2012, and 2013. He also won the German Cup with Bamberg, in 2010, 2011, and 2012, and the German Supercup four times (2007, 2010, 2011, 2012). Following his retirement in 2014, Brose Baskets retired his jersey number 23.

High school
Jacobsen attended Glendora High School, in Glendora, California, where he played high school basketball. He was a McDonald's All-American selection.

College career
After high school, Jacobsen played NCAA Division I college basketball at Stanford University, where he scored a career-high of 49 points against Arizona State University, on January 31, 2002. He was a First Team All-American his sophomore year, and a Second Team All-American his junior year. Jacobsen was also a three-time All-Pac-10 selection. In his three years in college with Stanford, he finished third in points scored (1,723), sixth in points per game (18.1), second in three-point goals (222), and fourth in three-point percentage (.427) in the school's history.

Professional career
After his career at Stanford University, Jacobsen was the 22nd overall pick in the 2002 NBA Draft, selected by the Phoenix Suns. He was later traded to the New Orleans Hornets in exchange for Jim Jackson. Jacobsen averaged 5.2 points per game through his career and is known as a player with exceptional range on his shot, out to beyond the NBA three-point line. His usual positions are shooting guard and small forward.

After playing for TAU Vitoria of the Spanish ACB League during the 2005-06 season, he signed a non-guaranteed contract with the Houston Rockets, and played in four preseason games with them, but was released on October 27, 2006, before the 2006-07 season began. Jacobsen then moved to the Brose Baskets (Bamberg, Germany) of the German League, where he won the German Basketball Championship in 2007, and he also earned the Finals MVP Award.

Jacobsen returned to the NBA when he was signed by the Memphis Grizzlies on July 24, 2007 and he spent the 2007–08 season with them.

On July 1, 2008, the Grizzlies chose not to offer Jacobsen a new contract, making him an unrestricted free agent. Jacobsen's final NBA game was on April 16th, 2008 in a 111 - 120 loss to the  Denver Nuggets  where he recorded 8 points, 7 assists and 5 rebounds.

In August 2008, he signed with the German League club ALBA Berlin.

In June 2009 Jacobsen signed a new contract with his former team Brose Baskets Bamberg in Germany. He led his team to win both the German Cup (Pokalsieger)  and German Championship  in 2010 and was again named Finals MVP.

Jacobsen re-signed with Brose Baskets Bamberg in August 2010 for the 2010-2011 season. The team again won the German Cup in April 2011. At game five of the finals he announced that he extended his contract for three more years. During this time, he won the German Championships in the years 2012 and 2013 and also the German Cup in 2012. In May 2014, Jacobsen, along with his longtime teammate John Goldsberry, announced retirement from the professional basketball. In tribute to him, Brose Baskets retired his 23 jersey number.

Post-playing career
After retiring from playing basketball, it was announced by the Phoenix Suns that Jacobsen would not only be a broadcaster during some pre-game and post-game shows with Tom Chambers, but he would also hold his own show under the Rise Suns Digital Network. He'd make his debut as a broadcaster on the November 2014 game against the Sacramento Kings. In addition, Jacobsen would also take on the college basketball analyst role for Fox Sports and the Pac-12 Networks.

NBA career statistics

Regular season

|-
| align="left" | 2002–03
| align="left" | Phoenix
| 72 || 0 || 15.9 || .373 || .315 || .686 || 1.2 || 1.0 || .5 || .1 || 5.1
|-
| align="left" | 2003–04
| align="left" | Phoenix
| 78 || 13 || 23.4 || .417 || .417 || .820 || 2.6 || 1.3 || .6 || .1 || 6.0
|-
| align="left" | 2004–05
| align="left" | Phoenix
| 40 || 0 || 19.2 || .414 || .382 || .774 || 1.7 || .9 || .3 || .0 || 5.3
|-
| align="left" | 2004–05
| align="left" | New Orleans
| 44 || 1 || 23.4 || .398 || .364 || .792 || 2.3 || 1.7 || .5 || .2 || 7.6
|-
| align="left" | 2007–08
| align="left" | Memphis
| 53 || 0 || 10.3 || .339 || .222 || .765 || 1.2 || .4 || .1 || .0 || 2.0
|- class="sortbottom"
| style="text-align:center;" colspan="2"| Career
| 287 || 14 || 18.5 || .393 || .352 || .769 || 1.8 || 1.1 || .4 || .1 || 5.2

Playoffs

|-
| align="left" | 2002–03
| align="left" | Phoenix
| 6 || 0 || 6.5 || .200 || .400 || .000 || .5 || .3 || .5 || .0 || 1.0
|- class="sortbottom"
| style="text-align:center;" colspan="2"| Career
| 6 || 0 || 6.5 || .200 || .400 || .000 || .5 || .3 || .5 || .0 || 1.0

References

External links
 NBA.com: Casey Jacobsen Info Page
 Euroleague.net Player Profile

1981 births
Living people
Alba Berlin players
All-American college men's basketball players
American expatriate basketball people in Germany
American expatriate basketball people in Spain
American men's basketball players
Basketball players from California
Brose Bamberg players
Liga ACB players
McDonald's High School All-Americans
Memphis Grizzlies players
New Orleans Hornets players
Parade High School All-Americans (boys' basketball)
Phoenix Suns announcers
Phoenix Suns draft picks
Phoenix Suns players
Saski Baskonia players
Shooting guards
Small forwards
Sportspeople from Los Angeles County, California
Stanford Cardinal men's basketball players